CCX may mean:

210 in roman numerals
AD 210, the year of the Common Era
Chicago Climate Exchange, North American greenhouse gas reduction and trading system
Cisco Compatible EXtensions, a specification for 802.11 wireless LAN chip manufacturers
Koenigsegg CCX, a sports car
CCX, the coal mining company that is controlled by the Brazilian conglomerate EBX Group
CCX, the name given to Core Complex, a building block in AMD's Zen microarchitecture and its successor architectures
CCX, the Australian Stock Exchange code for City Chic Collective

See also
 CX (disambiguation)
 CXX (disambiguation)
 c2x (C programming language standard)